The Chairman's Ear (Polish: Ucho Prezesa) is a Polish political satire web series broadcast since 9 January 2017 on YouTube, and since 15 February 2017 on Showmax. It is created by Robert Górski, the lead member of the Kabaret Moralnego Niepokoju.

Plot 
The series follows the chairman of the ruling political party in Poland (Mr Chairman). The narrative takes place primarily in his office where, joined by his assistant Mariusz, he hosts numerous visitors, including government officials and other public office holders. While Mr Chairman does not hold any elected office himself, it is clear that key political decisions are made in this office, and not in the Chancellery of the Prime Minister (who herself frequents the office). The plot is deeply rooted in contemporary Polish politics, with each character having a real-life counterpart, with whom they share first names (their surnames are never revealed). The titular character of Mr Chairman is based on Jarosław Kaczyński, the leader of the governing Law and Justice party.

The Chairman's Ear is a continuation of a series of cabaret scenes named Government meeting (Polish: Posiedzenie rządu) in which Robert Górski and other cabaret artists impersonated the members of the Civic Platform and the Polish People's Party.

Cast

References

2017 Polish television series debuts
2017 web series debuts
2010s comedy-drama television series
2010s Polish television series
2010s political television series
2010s satirical television series
Comedy web series
Cultural depictions of politicians
Drama web series
Parody television series
Polish-language television shows
Polish comedy-drama television series
Polish web series
Political satirical television series
Political web series
Television series based on actual events
Television shows set in Warsaw
Works about politicians
2010s YouTube series